Gyaincain Norbu (born June 1932) is a Tibetan politician. He was Chairman of the Tibet Autonomous Region from 1990 to 1998. He was succeeded by Legqog.

In November 1995, Gyaincain Norbu presided at a ceremony organised by the Chinese government to select its approved claimant to title of 11th Panchen Lama from a list of finalists by using the Golden Urn. The boy selected at this ceremony was also named Gyaincain Norbu, which is a fairly common Tibetan name. The boy is of no relation to Chairman Gyaincain Norbu.

References

Tibetan politicians
Living people
1932 births
People from Garze
People's Republic of China politicians from Tibet
Chinese Communist Party politicians from Tibet
Political office-holders in Tibet
China University of Political Science and Law alumni
Delegates to the 9th National People's Congress
Delegates to the 8th National People's Congress